Red River Bridge may refer to:

Red River Bridge (Arkansas)
Cane Hill Road Bridge, near Prairie Grove, Arkansas, also known as Little Red River Bridge
U.S. 165 Business Bridge, also known as Red River Bridge, in Alexandria, Louisiana
Sorlie Memorial Bridge, Grand Forks, North Dakota, also known as Red River Bridge
State Highway No. 78 Bridge at the Red River

See also
Red River Bridge War
Red River (disambiguation)